The 1918 Baylor Bears football team was an American football team that represented Baylor University as a member of the Southwest Conference (SWC) during the 1918 college football season. In its fifth season under head coach Charles Mosley, the team compiled a 0–6 record and was outscored by a total of 92 to 19.

Schedule

References

Baylor
Baylor Bears football seasons
College football winless seasons
Baylor Bears football